Carsonville Township is a township in Becker County, Minnesota, United States. The population was 252 as of the 2000 census.

History
Carsonville Township was organized in 1881. It was named for George M. Carson, a settler who arrived in 1879.

Geography
The Shell River flows eastwardly through the township from its source in Shell Lake in the northwestern part of the township.

Major highway
  Minnesota State Highway 34

Lakes
 Bottomless Lake
 Cranberry Lake
 Elbow Lake
 Guyles Lake
 Linbom Lake
 Mud Lake
 Shell Lake (east edge)

Adjacent townships
 Pine Point Township (north)
 Two Inlets Township (northeast)
 Osage Township (east)
 Green Valley Township (southeast)
 Wolf Lake Township (south)
 Toad Lake Township (southwest)
 Shell Lake Township (west)

Cemeteries
The township contains these two cemeteries: Linnel and Saint Paul's Lutheran.

Demographics
As of the census of 2000, there were 252 people, 99 households, and 69 families residing in the township.  The population density was 7.2 people per square mile (2.8/km2).  There were 120 housing units at an average density of 3.4/sq mi (1.3/km2).  The racial makeup of the township was 83.33% White, 14.68% Native American, and 1.98% from two or more races. Hispanic or Latino of any race were 1.19% of the population.

There were 99 households, out of which 34.3% had children under the age of 18 living with them, 56.6% were married couples living together, 11.1% had a female householder with no husband present, and 29.3% were non-families. 26.3% of all households were made up of individuals, and 11.1% had someone living alone who was 65 years of age or older.  The average household size was 2.55 and the average family size was 3.04.

In the township the population was spread out, with 29.0% under the age of 18, 4.0% from 18 to 24, 27.8% from 25 to 44, 24.6% from 45 to 64, and 14.7% who were 65 years of age or older.  The median age was 39 years. For every 100 females, there were 101.6 males.  For every 100 females age 18 and over, there were 108.1 males.

The median income for a household in the township was $35,000, and the median income for a family was $37,000. Males had a median income of $27,188 versus $20,208 for females. The per capita income for the township was $15,768.  About 9.1% of families and 10.7% of the population were below the poverty line, including 10.0% of those under the age of eighteen and 3.8% of those 65 or over.

References

External links
 United States National Atlas
 United States Census Bureau 2007 TIGER/Line Shapefiles
 United States Board on Geographic Names (GNIS)

Townships in Becker County, Minnesota
Townships in Minnesota